Khed Caves, also Bouddh Caves, are a series of ancient Buddhist caves in the city of Khed, Maharashtra, India.

The group of caves comprises a large vihara, with three cells for monks, and with a stupa in the back located in an oblong room. There are also four smaller caves in the group. The caves are in a rather derelict state.

References

External links
 Google images

Buddhist caves in India
Caves of Maharashtra
Indian rock-cut architecture
Former populated places in India
Buddhist pilgrimage sites in India
Buddhist monasteries in India
Caves containing pictograms in India
Tourist attractions in Ratnagiri district